Gem Souleyman is a British actor, who was born on 11 November 1987 in Enfield, England.

Filmography 

Before landing a role in Suzie Gold as Toby Gold, who was screen sister to the actress Summer Phoenix in 2004, Gem had an earlier role in 2001 in a film called Home Road Movies. Since then Gem has starred in a film starring Julie Walters called Ahead of the Class.

External links 

British male film actors
People from Enfield, London
1987 births
Living people